Edward Melville Parker (July 11, 1855 - October 22, 1925) was a bishop of the Episcopal Church in the United States.

Biography

Education
He was born in Cambridge, Massachusetts, the son of Henry Melville Parker and Fanny Cushing (Stone) Parker. He was educated at St. Paul's School in Concord, New Hampshire (1868-1874), and at Keble College, Oxford, England (B.A. 1878; M.A. 1881). He received a D.D. from the Berkeley Divinity School in 1906, and a D.C.L. from the Bishop's College (now Bishop's University) in Lennoxville, Quebec, in 1907.

Career
He was ordained deacon in 1879 and priest in 1881. From 1879 to 1906, he was master of St. Paul's School. He was made bishop coadjutor of New Hampshire in 1906 and was bishop from 1914 until 1925.

Marriage
He married Grace Elmendorf of Racine, Wisconsin, in 1885.  She died in 1888.

See also
 Episcopal Diocese of New Hampshire

References

 
 

1855 births
1925 deaths
Episcopal bishops of New Hampshire
People from Cambridge, Massachusetts
Berkeley Divinity School alumni
20th-century Anglican bishops in the United States
19th-century American Episcopalians
Alumni of Keble College, Oxford
People from Concord, New Hampshire